A new law approved in July 2008 changed the military ranks of Venezuela, principally with regard to names, functions and commanding regulation of the armed forces. The law was sanctioned by Venezuela's National Assembly.

The main changes are for the General Officer Ranks, with the incorporation of the “Comandante en Jefe” rank, the upgrading of the “General en Jefe/Almirante en Jefe” Rank to that of a full 4-star general/flag officer rank, and the creation of the “Mayor General/Almirante” Rank.

Throughout Venezuelan Military history, the ranks system has been notably complex and quite different from other armies in Latin America and NATO. It has 3 types of Non-Commissioned Officers: Technical NCO's and Warrant Officers, Professional NCO's, and Enlisted NCO's – the largest in any military force worldwide.

History 
Historically the Venezuelan system of ranks and insignia was based on Prussian patterns, just as is currently the case in the Chilean and Ecuadorian army. However, currently Prussian-style insignia are preserved only in the ceremonial full dress uniform (not displayed below), while for everyday use a system with simpler patterns was introduced. Only the Army and National Guard use the Prussian pattern in the ceremonial uniforms, while these services also have Prussian pattern epaulettes worn by select officers in command billets.

The Navy's rank insignia for officers follow the British pattern on the sleeve with the use of the executive curl due to the strong British influence.

Comandante en jefe (Commander in chief)

The office of the Venezuelan military supreme commander has always been held by the President of Venezuela as per constitutional requirements, however with the new law sanctioned in 2008, the “Comandante en Jefe” is not only a function and an appointment attributed to the executive branch, but is now set to be a military rank equivalent to a Five Stars General or a Marshall. Anybody who gets elected President of Venezuela is automatically made a full general of the National Armed Forces and may be granted full military uniform, but he may wear it or not depending on the circumstances.

Hugo Chávez left the Army as a lieutenant colonel in 1992, but when he became president he adopted the uniform of "Commander in Chief", with distinctive shoulder badge and sleeve and epaulet insignia and carried a saber similar to Simon Bolivar's in military events. During the Nicolas Maduro administration however, the rank insignia and epaulet (as well as the saber) were not worn by him during major military events, instead preferring to wear civilian dress or suits during formal events (with the national flag sash and the presidential medal). He wore a version of the "Commander in Chief" uniform for the first time on February 19, 2020, during a meeting with senior military leaders.

This rank holds the direct operational control and command over all armed forces, and is held while he is in the presidential office.

The position is a copy of the one used by Fidel Castro in Cuba, and the design of the shoulder patch are very similar, but not in the shoulder board and epaulet on the dress uniform since Venezuelan military ranks are inspired by German (especially Prussian) military influence, and thus is similar to a Marshal of the German Democratic Republic but with a dark red star inside.

Officer ranks 
The following are the rank insignia for commissioned officers for the army, navy and air force respectively. The Venezuelan National Guard uses the Army rank system while the militia uses the rank system according to their function (ground, naval, or air).

Technical Non-commissioned officers and Warrant officers 

These were, until their transformation into the technical officers corps in 2009, technical high-ranking non-commissioned personnel and warrant officers, with a technical and professional degree, which are usually assigned to technical positions inside the National Armed Forces and as warrant officers in the different service arms. While the insignia for the ground and air forces and the National Guard and Militia (featured here) are both on the shoulders and collars, naval insignia are also used on the sleeve.

Professional and enlisted Other Ranks 
The following are rank insignia for enlisted personnel and ratings for the army, navy and air force respectively. Ranks used by the Army are also used by the other service branches, the National Guard and the ground and naval forces of the National Militia.

Cadet officer ranks
In the 5 military schools of Venezuela, special military ranks are used by officer candidates and aspirants, with Cadet as the lowest rank, and with the highest ranks of Ensign or Midshipman depending on the service academy save for the Military Technical Academy, Military Medical Academy and Troop Officers Military College whose cadets come from all the service branches, and are ranked as per their service academies.

Cadet ranks of the Military Academies of the Army, Air Force and the National Guard
 Alférez Mayor (Cadet Senior Ensign)
 Alférez Auxilar (Cadet Auxiliary Ensign)
 Alférez (Cadet Ensign)
 Brigadier Mayor (Cadet Brigadier Major)
 Primer Brigadier (Cadet Brigadier 1st Class)
 Brigadier (Cadet Brigadier)
 Sub-Brigadier (Cadet Sub-Brigadier)
 Distinguido (Cadet 1st Class)
 Cadete (Cadet)

Midshipmen ranks of the Venezuelan Naval Academy
Guardiamarina Mayor (Senior Midshipman)
Guardiamarina Auxiliar (Junior Midshipman)
Guardiamarina (Midshipman)
Brigadier Mayor (Cadet Brigadier Major)
Brigadier Primero (Cadet Brigadier 1st Class)
Brigadier (Cadet Brigadier)
Sub-Brigadier (Cadet Sub-Brigadier)
Distinguido (Cadet 1st Class)
Cadete (Cadet)

Rank insignia for the cadets of the service academies are both on the shoulders and on the sleeves of all uniforms save for the combat uniform. Military high schools share the same insignia but use different ranks.

See also
 National Bolivarian Armed Forces of Venezuela

References

External links
 
 

Military ranks by country
Military of Venezuela

es:Anexo:Rangos militares de Venezuela